The National Association of Television Program Executives (NATPE) is a professional association of television and emerging media executives. The organization was established in 1963.

NATPE implements its mission by providing members with education, networking, professional enhancement and technological guidance through year-round activities, directories, and events.  The organization also offers online services to its membership including a propriety industry networking tool, special partner offers, and educational opportunities.

Historically, it is known for its annual NATPE Market & Conference, which is the American programming market serving the worldwide television community as well as one of the top new media and technology conferences. Amongst those in attendance include media buyers, broadcast and cable networks and channels looking to acquire programming, program distribution companies, financiers, advertisers, technology companies, and content producers.

History
As the medium of television grew up, program directors at local U.S. television stations felt a need for a program specific forum to discuss and resolve the challenges faced as a result of the Prime Time Access Rule, which gave responsibility for programming between 7 p.m. and 8 p.m. to local stations and program directors.  Encouraged by syndicated programming salesmen, 64 program directors (NATPE’s charter members) named Stan Cohen of WDSU New Orleans temporary president and set about organizing a meeting.

The first formal meeting of the National Associates of Television Program Executives was held in May 1964 at the New York Hilton Hotel and drew 71 registrants.  The majority of participants were program directors.  During the first two-day meeting in New York, the topics of discussion ranged from “The Network’s Relationship to Local Programming” and “Where Do You Find Talent?” to “Government’s Influence on Programming” and “Successful Formats for Handling Politicians & Political Issues.”

NATPE has changed dramatically over the past 40 years - membership grew from 64 to 210 by 1970; up to 1,206 in 1980; 1,818 in 1990; and to a peak of 3,812 by in January 2000, although membership and conference attendance declined  significantly from the "dot-com bust" of 2001.  In 2010 NATPE re-branded itself as NATPE Content First, and expanded into actively pursuing new media and technology speakers, exhibitors, and attendees in addition to their customary television members.  This effort has allowed NATPE to re-grow and expand much of its membership base.

As an added link between the television industry, the academic community and students, the NATPE Educational Foundation, was formed in 1978.  Its mission is to reach out to students by providing hands-on opportunities for them and their teachers in order to help prepare them for a future in television. NATPE’s Educational Foundation, underwritten by membership fees and the support of sponsors and special endowments, provides a number of annual fellowship, grants and prizes to the academic community.  Lew Klein, one of the founders of NATPE and an early president of the organization, continues his dedication to the association as president of the Educational Foundation.

In 2019, NATPE signed a partnership deal with China International Television Corporation (CITVC) is a wholly-owned subsidiary of Chinese state broadcaster China Central Television (CCTV).

NATPE announced in October 2022 that it planned to file for bankruptcy, stating that it was "optimistic that [NATPE] will emerge from the reorganization process in the same position". NATPE added it still intended to hold its annual conference in January 2023 in the Bahamas though then cancelling the event

Budapest
In 2011, NATPE acquired DISCOP EAST and renamed the event NATPE||Budapest. The market primarily covers the Central and Eastern Europe television industry.

NATPE Budapest 2013 was held at the Sofitel Chain Bridge Hotel in Budapest, Hungary, from June 24–27, 2013.

References

External links
 

Television organizations in the United States
Professional associations based in the United States
Film markets
1963 establishments in the United States
Organizations established in 1963
Companies that filed for Chapter 11 bankruptcy in 2022